Smith Field  is a city-owned, public-use airport located three nautical miles (6 km) northeast of the central business district of Siloam Springs, a city in Benton County, Arkansas, United States. According to the FAA's National Plan of Integrated Airport Systems for 2009–2013, it is categorized as a general aviation airport.

Facilities and aircraft 
It has one runway designated 18/36 with an asphalt surface measuring 4,997 by 75 feet (1,523 x 23 m).

For the 12-month period ending February 28, 2021, the airport had 24,050 aircraft operations, an average of 66 per day: 99.8% general aviation and 0.2% military. At that time there were 18 aircraft based at this airport: 83% single-engine, 11% multi-engine, and 6% jet.

References

External links 
 Aerial image as of 4 April 2000 from USGS The National Map

Airports in Arkansas
Buildings and structures in Siloam Springs, Arkansas
Transportation in Benton County, Arkansas